Patsy Cline (1932–1963) was an American country music singer.

Patsy Cline may refer to her eponymous albums:

 Patsy Cline (album), 1957 studio album
 Patsy Cline (1957 EP)
 Patsy Cline (1961 EP)
 Patsy Cline (1962 EP)